Regent Seven Seas Cruises (RSSC), formerly known as Radisson Seven Seas Cruises, is a luxury cruise line headquartered in Miami, Florida.

Since September 2014, Regent Seven Seas Cruises has been a wholly owned subsidiary owned of Norwegian Cruise Line Holdings, which also owns Norwegian Cruise Line and Oceania Cruises.

Ownership
Apollo Global Management, a New York-based private equity firm, purchased Regent Seven Seas Cruises from Carlson Companies. for $1 billion in February 2008. Apollo also owned Oceania Cruises and 15.8% of Norwegian Cruise Line. Carlson retained ownership of the master Regent brand, along with the operations of Regent Hotels & Resorts around the world.

Following the purchase, Apollo made public their plans to order a new ship for Regent. The new ship was planned to be of similar dimensions and capacity as the Seven Seas Voyager and Seven Seas Mariner, but with larger accommodations and expanded public spaces. This was to be the Seven Seas Explorer.

On September 2, 2014 Norwegian Cruise Line Holdings purchased Prestige Cruise Holdings, the parent company of Oceania Cruises and Regent Seven Seas Cruises, for $3.025 billion.

Fleet

Current ships

Future ships

Former ships
Radisson Diamond 1992-2005, since 2005 sailing as the casino cruise ship Asia Star
Song of Flower 1990-2003, sold to the Cie des Iles du Ponant
 Minerva
 Paul Gauguin

See also
 Oceania Cruises
 Seabourn Cruise Line
 Silversea Cruises

References

External links
Official website

Norwegian Cruise Line
Cruise lines
Transport companies established in 1992
2014 mergers and acquisitions
Companies based in Fort Lauderdale, Florida
Private equity portfolio companies
Apollo Global Management companies
Former Carlson (company) subsidiaries